Abdou Manzo (born 1959) is a Nigerien long-distance runner. He competed in the men's marathon at the 1988, 1992 and the 1996 Summer Olympics.

References

External links
 

1959 births
Living people
Athletes (track and field) at the 1988 Summer Olympics
Athletes (track and field) at the 1992 Summer Olympics
Athletes (track and field) at the 1996 Summer Olympics
Nigerien male long-distance runners
Nigerien male marathon runners
Olympic athletes of Niger
Place of birth missing (living people)
Olympic male marathon runners